The canton of Melesse is an administrative division of the Ille-et-Vilaine department, in northwestern France. It was created at the French canton reorganisation which came into effect in March 2015. Its seat is in Melesse.

It consists of the following communes: 
 
Clayes 
Gévezé
Guipel
Hédé-Bazouges
Langouet
Melesse
La Mézière
Montreuil-le-Gast
Parthenay-de-Bretagne
Saint-Germain-sur-Ille
Saint-Gilles
Saint-Gondran
Saint-Médard-sur-Ille
Saint-Symphorien
Vignoc

References

Cantons of Ille-et-Vilaine